Kabir Kouh Protected Area is a nature conservatory in Darreh Shahr and Badreh counties, Ilam Province, Iran.

The area is mostly mountainous with steep slopes, a rocky base and shallow soil. Water stream are prevalent in the area.

Geology 
Kabir Kou Protected Area is located in the Zagros Mountains.  Its lithology is generally composed of sedimentary rocks and this has played an important role in the emergence and evolution of vegetation and the biodiversity of the region and the formation of wildlife habitats. The geological units and existing deposits, due to lateral pressures on both sides of the northeastern and southwest, have become folded into a set of anti-knives. As a result, there have been numerous dangers and diversions that actually form the mountains and valleys of the area.

Climate 
Therefore, the driest season is summer.

The average annual maximum temperature varies between 15 and 30 °C at different altitudes and the average annual minimum temperature between −2° to 16 °C. The maximum and minimum absolute temperatures ever recorded are 47 and −15 °C. The average maximum and minimum temperatures are 21.7 and 11.6 °C.

The average annual relative humidity of the region is 47.1 percent. August has the lowest and February the highest relative humidity.

Flora 
Most of the area is covered by forests and pastures. The vegetation in area varies, the farther it is from settlements, the richer the vegetation gets. Due to excessive exploitation, the soil has been subject to erosion in many areas and many gullies have been forming. The deforestation is also prevalent in the region as people use the tree forage for their livestock. Nevertheless, ever since the establishment of the protected area, the degradation has been slowing down.

The Quercus persica is the prevalent tree in the higher altitudes. There is also a very small patch of woods with a rare species of Pterocarya fraxinifolia near Badreh.

The most important herbaceous species are:

 Fraxinus excelsior
 Celtis australis
 Prunus scoparia
 Prunus incana
 Adiantum capillus-veneris
 Peganum harmala
 Jerusalem sage
 Daphne sericea
 Crataegus
 Pistacia atlantica
 Achillea millefolium

Fauna 
Due to its special rocky landscape, steep slopes and high cliffs, the area is home to a diverse range of inhabitants. A full wildlife descriptions of the region requires further studies. Nonetheless, the most important species are Bear, Persian leopard, Hare, Wildcat, Caracal, Wolf, Jackal, Fox, Hyena, Weasel, Caucasian squirrel, Southern white-breasted hedgehog, Long-eared hedgehog, Grey dwarf hamster and Wild goat.

References

Protected areas of Iran